Voids, Echoes And Whispers is a self-produced album by Marzio Scholten which was released on April 19, 2012.

Excerpt from the album review by the influential jazz music website All About Jazz: "For his third release, Marzio Scholten capitalizes on the unexpectedly impressive ... World of Thought (OAP, 2010). ... If there's a single strength amongst Voids, Echoes And Whispers' many, it's Scholten's growing maturity as a writer and performer."

Tokyo Jazz Notes published an excellent review of the album and its readers selected Voids, Echoes And Whispers as runner up in the category 'Best International Jazz Album' of 2012. The opening track of the album, "The King Is Dead (Long Live The King)", received an honorable mention in the 2011 International Songwriting Competition in the category 'Jazz'.

Track listing
The King Is Dead (Long Live The King) – 7:10
Voids, Echoes and Whispers – 8:42
A Million Ways of Thinking – 9:03
Air – 9:51
Oxygen (Interlude) – 1:00
Optimus Prime – 7:18
The Murals of Seagram – 11:08
Path to Nirvana – 3:46
Revolution Is Everywhere – 4:44

All compositions by Marzio Scholten

Personnel
Marzio Scholten – Guitar
Yaniv Nachum – Tenor Saxophone
Randal Corsen – Piano
Stefan Lievestro – Double Bass
Mark Schilders – Drums

References 

2012 albums
Marzio Scholten albums